Victoria Leyde is a Honduran football club based in La Ceiba, Honduras.

They are Victoria's reserve team. It currently plays in Liga Mayor de Futbol de Honduras

Football clubs in Honduras